During the 1978–79 English football season, Everton F.C. competed in the Football League First Division. They finished 4th in the table with 51 points.

Final league table

Results

Football League First Division

FA Cup

League Cup

UEFA Cup

Squad

References

1978-79
Everton
Everton F.C. season